In inventory management, a stock keeping unit (abbreviated as SKU and pronounced   or  ) is the unit of measure in which the stocks of a material are managed. Or to put it another way; it is a distinct type of item for sale, purchased, or tracked in inventory, such as a product or service, and all attributes associated with the item type that distinguish it from other item types (for a product, these attributes can include manufacturer, description, material, size, color, packaging, and warranty terms). When a business records the inventory of its stock, it counts the quantity it has of each unit, or SKU.

SKU can also refer to a unique identifier or code, sometimes represented via a barcode for scanning and tracking, which refers to the particular stock keeping unit. These identifiers are not regulated or standardized. When a company receives items from a vendor, it has a choice of maintaining the vendor's SKU or creating its own. This makes them distinct from Global Trade Item Number (GTIN), which are standard, global, tracking units. Universal Product Code (UPC), European Article Number (EAN), and Australian Product Number (APN) are special cases of GTINs.

See also
 Part number
 Price look-up code
 Catalog number (commercial products)
 Amazon Standard Identification Number

References

External links
 Stock Keeping Unit – SKU at Investopedia
 SKU at the Encyclopædia Britannica

Product classifications
Inventory